Nicholas John Turner,  is a British chemist and a Professor in the Department of Chemistry at The University of Manchester. His research in general is based on biochemistry and organic chemistry, specifically on biotechnology, cell biology, biocatalysis and organic synthesis.

Education 
Turner completed his Bachelor of Science degree in Chemistry in 1982 at University of Bristol. He then read for his Doctor of Philosophy degree at University of Oxford on Mechanistic studies on isopenicillin N synthase and successfully completed it in 1985. His PhD was supervised by Prof. Sir. Jack Baldwin.

Research and career 

Upon completing his PhD, Turner spent two years (1985 - 1987) with Prof. George M. Whitesides at Harvard University as a Royal Society Junior Research Fellow. He then moved to University of Exeter as a Lecturer in 1987, before moving to University of Edinburgh for the position of Reader in 1995. He was promoted to the position of Professor in 1998 and moved to University of Manchester as a Professor of Chemical Biology in 2004.

Turner's research in general is based on biochemistry and organic chemistry, specifically on biotechnology, cell biology, biocatalysis and organic synthesis.

Turner is the Director of CoEBio3, an organisation designed to provide scientific environment in which the necessary research and development can be carried out to create new biocatalyst-based processes to meet the changing needs of industry in the next 10–20 years. He is also the Co-founder of Ingenza and Co-director of SYNBIOCHEM. Turner is also the author of several books in the field of biocatalysis including Introduction to Biocatalysis Using Enzymes and Microorganisms, and Biocatalysis in Organic Synthesis: The Retrosynthesis Approach.

Notable work 

Turner was elected as a Fellow of the Royal Society in the year 2020. Regarded one of the world's leading researchers in the field of Biocatalysis, his profile reads;

"Nicholas Turner undertakes research focussed on creating new enzymes for application as biocatalysts for chemical synthesis. His group combine enzyme discovery with protein engineering and directed evolution methods in order to develop biocatalysts with tailored properties including high (stereo)selectivity, improved activity and enhanced stability. These biocatalysts, which include amine/alcohol oxidases, imine reductases, lyases, transaminases and monooxygenases, are then applied to the synthesis of a range of target molecules especially pharmaceuticals and fine chemicals.

Nick also has a passion for promoting the wider application of biocatalysis across the entire chemical community and has developed guidelines for 'biocatalytic retrosynthesis' to encourage greater adoption of biocatalysis amongst synthetic chemists. These guidelines enable multi-enzyme cascades to be designed and developed for the conversion of simple, sustainable feedstocks to more complex, target molecules."

Awards and nominations 
 RSC Carbohydrate Chemistry Award (1992)
 Corday–Morgan Prize (1996)
 RSC Industrial Organic Award (2009)  
 Organic Stereochemistry Award (2017)  
 ACS Catalysis Lectureship (2018)  
 Fellow of the Royal Society (2020)

Major Publications

References

External links
  at University of Manchester

Living people
British chemists
Academics of the University of Manchester
21st-century chemists
Alumni of the University of Bristol
Alumni of the University of Oxford
Fellows of the Royal Society
Year of birth missing (living people)